First Sessions is an EP by singer Norah Jones, released in 2001. The EP was a limited release of approximately 10,000 copies which were available on Jones' website and at live shows.

Background
As the name suggests, First Sessions marked the first recordings made by Jones after being signed with Blue Note Records. Label A&R Brian Bacchus put the singer with experienced engineer Jay Newland to record demos of around nine songs. Six of these were chosen for the sampler release First Sessions, while the remainder were set aside for consideration for her debut album Come Away with Me.  Ultimately, most of the songs featured here ended up on Come Away with Me.

Track listing

Personnel
Norah Jones - piano, vocals
Lee Alexander - bass
Jesse Harris - guitar
Olivier Vieser - guitar
Dan Rieser - drums
Adam Rogers - guitar (track 4)
Tony Scherr - acoustic and slide guitar (track 5)

Production
Recording engineer and mix: Jay Newland

References

2001 debut EPs
Norah Jones albums
Blue Note Records EPs